Greg Reely is a Canadian record producer, engineer, and mixer who has worked with acts such as Sarah McLachlan, Front Line Assembly, Fear Factory, Machine Head, Coldplay, The Tea Party, Spirit of the West and  others.

Credits
BAG - BAG, I Can't Shut My Mouth
Bleeding Through - Declaration
Boxcar - Vertigo
Coldplay - Live at the Commodore
D-Metal Stars - Metal Disney
Delerium - Nuages du Monde, Chimera, Aria, Poem, Karma, Delerium, Flowers Become Screens, Semantic Spaces
DevilDriver - DevilDriver, Fury of Our Maker's Hand
Devin Townsend - Infinity
Disney - Disney's Superstar Hits, Walt Disney Records Presents Superstar Hits
Dog's Eye View - Daisy
Equinox - Contact
Fear Factory - Demanufacture, Obsolete, Archetype, Mechanize, Remanufacture - Cloning Technology, Fear Is the Mindkiller, Cars, Zero Signal, Demolition Racer
Front Line Assembly - Artificial Soldier, Civilization, "Maniacal", Epitaph, Implode, "Comatose", FLARemix, Live Wired, "Plasticity", "Circuitry", Hard Wired, Millennium, "Surface Patterns", Tactical Neural Implant, "The Blade", "Virus", Caustic Grip, "Iceolate", "Improvised. Electronic. Device", "AirMech", "Echogenetic"
Impellitteri - Pedal to the Metal
Impellitteri - Wicked Maiden
Impellitteri - Venom
Machine Head - Old, Death Church
Mnemic - Mechanical Spin Phenomena
Nothnegal - 'Decadence'
Overkill - The Electric Age, White Devil Armory
Paradise Lost - Paradise Lost, Symbol of Life
Sarah McLachlan - When She Loved Me, Intimate & Interactive, Dear God, Good Enough, I Will Remember You, Possession, Solace, Steaming, Touch, Vox, Closer: The Best of Sarah McLachlan, Surfacing
Strapping Young Lad - Heavy as a Really Heavy Thing, Alien, For Those Aboot to Rock: Live at the Commodore
Skinny Puppy - Doomsday: Back and Forth Series 5: Live in Dresden, Worlock, Too Dark Park, Tormentor, Addiction, Shore Lined Poison
Tara MacLean - Silence
The Devin Townsend Band - Synchestra
The Tea Party - Alhambra, Sister Awake
Theatre of Tragedy - Storm
Threat Signal - Vigilance

Soundtracks
Resident Evil: Apocalypse
Lara Croft: Tomb Raider
Alone in the Dark
Mortal Kombat
Freddy Got Fingered
Get Carter
Galerians: Rion
Hideaway
The Rage: Carrie 2

References

[ Credits] at Allmusic.com
Discography at Discogs.com

External links
http://www.reely.com/greg/index.html

Canadian record producers
Living people
Year of birth missing (living people)